Cleon (fl. around 380 BCE) was an Ancient Greek sculptor of Sicyon. He was a pupil of Antiphanes, who had been taught by Periclytus, a follower of the great Polykleitos of Argos. 

Cleon's age is determined by two bronze statues of Zeus at Olympia executed after the 98th Olympiad, and another of Deinolochus, after the 102nd Olympiad. He excelled in portrait-statues of which several athletic ones are mentioned by Pausanias.

References

Sources
 

Ancient Greek sculptors
Year of birth unknown
Year of death unknown
Ancient Sicyonians